The death row phenomenon is the emotional distress felt by prisoners on death row. Concerns about the ethics of inflicting this distress upon prisoners have led to some legal concerns about the constitutionality of the death penalty in the United States and other countries. In relation to the use of solitary confinement with death row inmates, death row phenomenon and death row syndrome are two concepts that are gaining recognition. The death row syndrome is a distinct concept, which is the enduring psychological effects of the death row phenomenon, which merely refers to the triggers of the syndrome.

Harrison and Tamony define death row phenomenon as the harmful effects of death row conditions, while death row syndrome is the consequent manifestation of psychological illness that can occur as a result of death row phenomenon.

Phenomenon
Death row syndrome is a psychological disorder that inmates on death row can go through when they are put in isolation. Inmates affected by death row syndrome may display suicidal tendencies and psychotic delusions. According to some psychiatrists, the results of being confined to death row for an extended period of time, including the effects of knowing one will die and the living conditions, can fuel delusions and suicidal tendencies in an individual and can cause insanity in a form that is dangerous. Prisoners wait years for execution on death row and while waiting the prisoners go through painful isolation. They live in cells the size of parking spaces. Living in this kind of condition can amplify the effects of isolation. Most of the inmates stay in their cells for more than twenty hours a day. This kind of isolation and waiting for execution causes many inmates to die naturally.

The suicide rate of death row inmates was found by Lester and Tartaro to be 113 per 100,000 for the period 1976–1999. This is about ten times the rate of suicide in the United States as a whole and about six times the rate of suicide in the general U.S. prison population.

Since the re-institution of the death penalty in 1976 to January 1, 2017, 145 prisoners have waived their appeals and asked that the execution be carried out; most notably, the case of Gary Gilmore in Utah brought the ten-year national moratorium to a halt following Gregg v. Georgia. In the post-Furman era, four states (Connecticut, New Mexico, Oregon, and Pennsylvania) have executed only volunteers.

The theory of the death row phenomenon may be traced to 1989, when the European Court of Human Rights agreed that poor conditions on death row in Virginia should mean that a fugitive should not be extradited to the US unless the US agreed it would not execute the fugitive if the individual were convicted. Additionally, the number of years that the fugitive would be on death row was considered problematic. The case is known as Soering v. United Kingdom. Earlier, however, in 1950, a justice of the United States Supreme Court, in Solesbee v. Balkcom, remarked that the onset of insanity while awaiting execution of a death sentence is not a rare phenomenon. Often, the death row phenomenon, being a result of a prolonged stay on death row, is an unintentional result of the long procedures used in the attempt to ensure the death penalty is applied only to the guilty.

Legal ramifications
, arguments about the death row phenomenon have never been successful in avoiding the death penalty for any person in the United States, but the Supreme Court has been aware of the theory and has mentioned it in its decisions. When serial killer Michael Bruce Ross agreed to be executed in 2005, his decision sparked controversy over whether he could legally agree to such a thing, as the death row phenomenon might have contributed to his decision.

In Canada, the Supreme Court of Canada cited the death row phenomenon, along with a few other concerns about execution, to declare the risk of a prisoner being executed after extradition to another country to be a breach of fundamental justice⁠a legal right under Section 7 of the Canadian Charter of Rights and Freedoms in the Constitution of Canada. The case was United States v. Burns (2001). Earlier, in 1991, some Supreme Court justices had, in Kindler v. Canada (Minister of Justice), expressed skepticism about the legal argument regarding the phenomenon, writing that the stress was not as severe a punishment as the execution itself, and writing that the prisoners themselves choose to appeal their sentences, thus being responsible for the prolonged stay on death row.  In Burns, however, the Court acknowledged that the mere process of execution, including making sure that the sentence is carried out justly, "seems inevitably to provide lengthy delays, and the associated psychological trauma. This cast doubt on whether the risk of execution after extradition, as a whole, could be compatible with the principles of fundamental justice.

In Jamaica, in the case Pratt v Attorney General for Jamaica, the death penalty was overturned for two prisoners by the Judicial Committee of the Privy Council, who had made reference to the death row phenomenon. The judges opined that the prisoners had been on death row for too long, and too many appeals were allowed to the prisoners, who were forced by instinct to attempt to appeal and were thus confined to death row for too long.

United States Supreme Court Justices opposing the death penalty, such as Justice Stevens and Justice Breyer, have at multiple times argued in their dissents that the delay and waiting on death row was a factor making capital punishment unconstitutional as a cruel and unusual punishment. Their views were rejected by concurring opinions from more conservative justices such as Justice Scalia and Justice Thomas, who said that this long delay was caused by the convicts themselves because of their repeated appeals and by Justices opposed to the death penalty.

See also

 Death anxiety
 Death row
 List of United States death row inmates

References

External links
 Death Row Phenomenon: Death Penalty Worldwide  – Academic research database on the laws, practice, and statistics of capital punishment for every death penalty country in the world.

Capital punishment
Psychopathological syndromes